Tullintori is a shopping center located in Tulli, Tampere, Finland. The largest of the two owners of the shopping center is Elo Mutual Pension Insurance Company, who own 97%. The shopping center contains around 50 shops and numerous cafés and restaurants and a recreational climbing area. The top floors are mainly office space. The annual number of visitors to the center is about 2,5 million. Architecturally, Tullintori is a traditional arcade, glass-covered “colonnade”. It was formed by combining SOK's functionalist building, completed in 1930, with a new extension. The Tullintori shopping center was completed in 1990.

Tullintori is located right next to Tampere Central Station. Parking lots can be found on P-Tullintori and on the deck of Tullintori. The shopping center has access to Hotel Torni and Sokos Hotel Villa.

See also
 Koskikeskus (shopping centre)
 Ratina (shopping centre)

References

External links 

 Tullintori Official Site

Shopping centres in Tampere
Shopping malls established in 1990